Events from the year 1991 in Sweden

Incumbents
 Monarch – Carl XVI Gustaf
 Prime Minister – Ingvar Carlsson, succeeded by Carl Bildt

Events
15 September – 1991 Swedish general election and 1991 Swedish municipal elections
 The Djurö National Park was established

Popular culture

Film
 11 February – The 26th Guldbagge Awards were presented

Births
24 January – Andreas Forsström, professional ice hockey player
13 February – Pontus Jansson, football player
22 February – Tobias Ludvigsson, cyclist
21 April – Kenza Zouiten, fashion model
24 April – Elisa Lindström, singer
26 April – Adrian Granat, professional boxer
11 May – Marcus Rohdén, football player
29 May – Oskar Eriksson, curler, Olympic medalist 2014
29 May – Tom Ljungman, actor
19 June – Pontus Ekhem, hockey player
6 July – Klas Dahlbeck, ice hockey player
9 July – Clara Mae, singer
7 November – Felix Rosenqvist, racing driver
11 December – Anna Bergendahl, singer

Deaths

26 January – Hans Strååt, film actor (born 1917)
27 January – Leif Wikström, sailor, Olympic champion 1956 (born 1918)
15 February – Birger Malmsten, actor (born 1920)
13 March – Göran Strindberg, cinematographer (born 1917)
 8 April – Per Yngve Ohlin, known as "Dead", rock musician (born 1969)
 26 April – Lars Hall, modern pentathlete, Olympic champion 1952 and 1956 (born 1927).
17 May – Göthe Grefbo, actor (born 1921)
5 June – Carl-Erik Holmberg, football player (born 1906)
30 June – Curt Weibull, cyclist (born 1907).
 5 July – Sandro Key-Åberg, writer (born 1922). 
30 September – Sven Barthel, journalist (born 1903)
9 November – Hans Liljedahl, sport shooter, Olympic medalist 1952 (born 1913).
 10 November – Gunnar Gren, footballer (born 1920).
10 November – Curt Weibull, historian (born 1886)
16 November – Gustav Wetterström, football player (born 1911)

Full date missing
Olle Hansson, cross country skier (born 1904)
Torsten Löwgren, painter (born 1903)
Åke Åkerström, archaeologist (born 1902)

See also
 1991 in Swedish television

References

 
Sweden
Years of the 20th century in Sweden